There are communes that have the name Mühledorf in Switzerland:

Mühledorf, Bern, in the Canton of Bern
Mühledorf, Solothurn, in the Canton of Solothurn